Sminthurinus is a genus of springtails and allies in the family Katiannidae. There are about 19 described species in Sminthurinus.

Species

References

Further reading

 
 

Springtail genera